The Glenn Miller Story is a compilation album of tracks recorded by the Glenn Miller Band between 1939 and 1942 which had been released as 78 rpm singles on the Bluebird and Victor labels. It was released in the United Kingdom in 1954 as a ten-inch  rpm monophonic LP on the His Master's Voice label, catalogue number DLP 1024. The front cover of the album shows monochrome photographs of Glenn Miller and James Stewart, both in the uniform of a major in the United States Army Air Forces. The full title (shown only on the front cover of the album) is The One and Only Glenn Miller Band Plays Music from Universal-International's "The Glenn Miller Story", but the film featured different recordings of the same tracks.

Track listing

See also
Glenn Miller Plays Selections From the Film "The Glenn Miller Story" – United States release with four tracks in common
The Glenn Miller Story (soundtrack) – recordings by the Universal-International studio orchestra, conducted by Joseph Gershenson

References

Glenn Miller compilation albums
1954 compilation albums
His Master's Voice albums